Skeletophyllon euphyes is a moth in the family Cossidae. It was described by West in 1932. It is found in Malaysia and Thailand and on Sumatra, Borneo, the Philippines and Sulawesi.

References

Natural History Museum Lepidoptera generic names catalog

Zeuzerinae
Moths described in 1932